Flight 831 may refer to

Trans-Canada Air Lines Flight 831, crashed on 29 November 1963
Aeroflot Flight 831, mid-air collision on 23 June 1969
Vietnam Airlines Flight 831, crashed on 9 September 1988

0831